Events in the year 2017 in Chile.

Incumbents
 President: Michelle Bachelet

Events

January – The 2017 Chile wildfires kill several people and destroy more than 1,000 buildings, including the town of Santa Olga.
 November – First round of Chilean general election, 2017
 December – Final round 
of Chilean general election, 2017

Deaths

24 January – Carlos Verdejo, footballer (b. 1934).

25 June – Olga Feliú, politician and lawyer (b. 1932)

References

 
2010s in Chile
Years of the 21st century in Chile
Chile
Chile